Oxy Music is the fourth studio album by Australian musician Alex Cameron, released by record label Secretly Canadian on 11 March 2022. Produced by Cameron, the album continues his signature style of storytelling from the perspectives of different characters. Initially inspired by Nico Walker's autofictional novel Cherry (2018), Oxy Music is primarily centered on a fictional man afflicted by the opioid epidemic in the United States. The album was preceded by the singles "Sara Jo", "Best Life" and "K Hole". The album has received generally favourable reviews from critics.

Critical reception 

Oxy Music was released to a positive reception from contemporary music critics. At Metacritic, which assigns a normalized rating out of 100 to reviews from mainstream critics, the album received an average score of 73, based on 11 reviews, which indicates "generally favorable reviews". Aggregator AnyDecentMusic? gave it 6.9 out of 10, based on their assessment of the critical consensus.

Ryan Bell of DIY wrote, "Its steady pace and relatively tame nature (by his standards) means it might not be his most immediately striking release, but it's still testament to his talent as an astute alt-pop songwriter." Michael Di Gennaro of Exclaim wrote, "Oxy Musics greatest strength is that it makes the plight of an addict easy to understand and sympathize with, and may even help addicts who tune in feel less alone."

In a negative review, Sophie Kemp of Pitchfork criticized the album's production as being among the weakest in Cameron's career. Kemp also criticized its concept, writing, "More than anything, it takes on the quality of a short story written by a young student trying to cram as many neon lights, bongs, uzis, blow jobs, g-strings, and jokes into 10 pages as possible. For how clearly smart, ambitious, and upsettingly tuneful Cameron is, it’s a pity that he uses his talent for these exercises in sophistry, music that feels so vacuous and fleeting that it becomes one with the very modernity it seeks to lampoon."

Track listing

Personnel 
Performance
 Alex Cameron – vocals, piano, keyboards, drum machine
 Henri Lindström – drums, percussion
 Justin Nijssen – bass, guitar, vocals
 Lilah Larson – guitar, vocals
 Jess Parsons – piano, keyboards, vocals
 Roy Molloy – saxophone
 Chris Pitsiokos – saxophone
 Lloyd Vines – vocals
 Jason Williamson – vocals
 Jackie McLean – vocals

Technical
 Alex Cameron – production, recording
 Justin Nijssen – additional production
 Lilah Larson – additional production
 Lauri Eloranta – drum recording
 Kai Campos – mixing (all tracks)
 Danny Trachtenberg – mixing (1)
 Joe LaPorta – mastering

Art
 Jemima Kirke – cover photography
 McLean Stephenson – cover photograph edit
 Nick Scott – layout

Charts

References 

2022 albums
Alex Cameron (musician) albums
Secretly Canadian albums
Fiction about substance abuse